Newtown Rangers AFC is an Irish association football club based in Kiltipper, Tallaght, Dublin. They have two senior men's teams that play in the Leinster Senior League Senior 1A Sunday Division and Major 1 Saturday Division. They also regularly compete in the FAI Cup, the FAI Intermediate Cup, the FAI Junior Cup, the Leinster Senior Cup and the Leinster Junior Cup.

History
The club was formed in Mrs Lizzie Farrell's kitchen in Newtown Park on the main road in Tallaght in 1957. The big highlight for the club during this period was winning the Leinster Junior Cup in 1966.

In 2002/03 former St Patrick's Athletic and Hall of Fame player Mark Ennis returned to the club to become first team manager. In 2003/04 this team would go on to win a treble under Ennis' stewardship - the Leinster Senior League Sunday Division 2 title, The Moore Cup and The Gilligan Cup. In 2013, the club opened a 40 x 50 metre flood lit training astro pitch at their home ground in Farrell Park. They field two senior teams in Leinster Senior League Senior 1 Sunday & Major 1 Saturday as of the 2021/22 season. They are managed by former Newtown Rangers AFC schoolboy and Bluebell United captain Glenn Madden, brother of former Irish former professional footballer Simon Madden. In 2017, the club celebrated their 60th anniversary and published a memorial booklet looking back at 60 years of history, photos of teams and players since their formation and interviews with former players and managers.

Club identity
Newtown Rangers AFC's home kit is a blue and white hooped jersey, traditionally worn with blue shorts and blue and white hooped socks. Their away jersey for the 2021/22 season is a predominantly black jersey with grey, black and white sleeves worn with black shorts and black socks.

Home ground
The club's home ground is Farrell Park, Ballymana Lane, Kiltipper, Dublin. They have dressing rooms and shower facilities within the clubhouse and car parking is available.

Rivalries
Newtown Rangers AFC traditional local rivals would be Sacred Heart Firhouse Clover Football Club due to the proximity of these clubs.

Further reading
Joe Dodd, George Briggs (1992). 100 Years of L.F.A: Leinster Football Association Centenary Yearbook.

References

Association football clubs established in 1957
1957 establishments in Ireland
Leinster Senior League (association football) clubs
Association football clubs in South Dublin (county)